The Rialto Poolroom Bar and Cafe, or simply Rialto is a billiard hall, cafe, and off-track betting parlor in Portland, Oregon, in the United States. It was established in 1920.

History
In September 2016, owner Arthur McFadden announced the venue's closure on December 25, and his retirement. In December, Frank Faillace and Manish Patel, who own multiple nightlife establishments in Portland, purchased Rialto and plan to keep the bar operating under the same name.

In October 2019, Rialto is named in lawsuits by American Society of Composers, Authors and Publishers for unauthorized performance of ASCAP members' copyrighted compositions at the venue in August 2019. According to the lawsuits, "ASCAP representatives have made numerous attempts to contact the Defendants" and that "Defendants have refused all of ASCAP's license offers."

See also
 Jack London Revue

References

External links

 

1920 establishments in Oregon
Billiard halls
Restaurants in Portland, Oregon
Southwest Portland, Oregon